The Halcyon class was a class of 21 oil-fired minesweepers (officially, "fleet minesweeping sloops") built for the British Royal Navy between 1933 and 1939. They were given traditional small ship names used historically by the Royal Navy and served during World War II.

Design
There were 21 ships in the Halcyon class, built in two groups; the first using reciprocating steam engines, with steam turbines in the latter. They were generally smaller versions of the  escort sloops. Niger and Salamander of the reciprocating group used vertical triple expansion engines, instead of the vertical compound engines of their sisters. As a result of the increased installed power they had a half knot speed advantage, even though they used slightly shorter hulls.

Gleaner, Franklin, Jason and Scott were completed as unarmed survey vessels, Sharpshooter and Seagull being converted to follow suit. They were all re-armed and deployed in their original role on the outbreak of war. Seagull had the first all-welded hull built for the Royal Navy.

Service history
Halcyons served in Home waters, at Dunkirk, on Arctic convoy duty, and in the Mediterranean Sea.

On 3 February 1940  (Cdr. A bomb pierced the fo'c'sle deck and exploding destroying the fore part of the ship. She remained afloat and was taken in tow by Halcyon but steadily flooded and capsized and sank. The wreck was later washed ashore north of Lybster and was sold for scrap. The Commanding Officer and forty of the men were killed in the explosion.

 (Lt.Cdr. F. B. Proudfoot, RN) was attacked and sunk by a force of German dive bombers off De Panne, Belgium on 1 June 1940. On board Skipjack were between 250 and 300 soldiers just rescued from the Dunkirk beaches during Operation Dynamo. Eyewitness William Stone said "she just disappeared".

Halcyons were pressed into service as anti-submarine escorts; this task slowly decreasing as the ships specifically designed for this task, such as s, came off the slips. Halcyons accompanied most of the Arctic convoys, serving both as minesweepers and anti-submarine escorts. Several spent extended periods working out of Soviet naval bases in Northern Russia, such as Murmansk. Four Halcyons were lost during this period.

  (Lt.Cdr. T. C. Crease), having escorted the very first Arctic convoy, attacked a German U-boat while escorting Convoy PQ 11, and helped rescue the crew of the cruiser . Gossamer was dive-bombed and sunk on 26 June 1942 in the Kola Inlet.
  (Cdr. A. J. Cubison, DSC and Bar) was lost off Iceland on 5 July 1942 while escorting Convoy QP 13, when part of the convoy wandered into a British minefield.
  was torpedoed and sunk in the Greenland Sea on 29 September 1942 while escorting Convoy QP 14.
 On 31 December 1943 during the Battle of the Barents Sea,  was attacked by the German heavy cruiser  while escorting Convoy JW 51B. After sustaining serious damage, Bramble was finished off by the German destroyer Eckoldt.

 and  served in the Mediterranean Sea as part of the 14th/17th Minesweeper Flotilla based in Malta. The minesweepers saw action during the Malta Convoys, Operation Torch, and Operation Corkscrew. Hebe was lost to a mine off Bari, Italy on 22 November 1943.

Friendly fire losses

The headquarters officer assigning the minesweeping project to 1MF neglected to inform the Flag Officer British Assault Area (Rear‑Admiral Rivett‑Carnac), who was responsible for defending the invasion beaches from E-boats operating out of Le Havre. 1MF was observed on a southwesterly leg of the minesweeping operation and assumed to be German ships proceeding to attack Allied shipping off the invasion beaches. The Admiral's staff requested No. 263 Squadron RAF and No. 266 Squadron RAF to attack the presumed enemy ships. The squadrons responded with 16 Typhoons armed with 20 mm cannon and High Explosive "60 lb" RP-3 unguided rockets. RAF pilots identified 1MF as probably friendly shipping, but upon questioning their orders were told the Royal Navy had no ships in the area.

In a well-executed attack out of the sun at 13:30, the Typhoons sank Britomart (Lt. Cdr. Nash, MBE, RNR) and Hussar (Lt.Cdr. A. J. Galvin, DSC, RNR); and Salamander was damaged so far beyond economical repair she was written off as a constructive total loss. Eighty-six British sailors were killed and 124 more were injured. 1MF identified the Typhoons as friendly, and poor visibility into the sun prevented early recognition of the impending "friendly fire". Jason established radio contact to terminate the attack.

Ships in class

Reciprocating group 
Ordered 1932
 HMS Halcyon, built by John Brown & Company, Clydebank, sold for scrapping 1950
 HMS Skipjack, built by John Brown, bombed and sunk off Dunkirk on 1 June 1940
Ordered 1933
 HMS Harrier, built by John I. Thornycroft & Company, Woolston, sold for scrapping 1950
 HMS Hussar, built by Thornycroft, sunk in error by RAF aircraft off Cap d'Antifer on 27 August 1944
Ordered 1934
 HMS Speedwell, built by William Hamilton and Company, Port Glasgow, sold out of service 1946, wrecked and scrapped 1954
Ordered 1935
 HMS Niger, built by J. Samuel White & Company, Cowes, mined off Iceland on 4 June 1942
 HMS Salamander, built by White, damaged in RAF rocket attack off Cap d'Antifer on 27 August 1944 and written off as constructive total loss, sold for scrapping 1946

Turbine group 
Ordered 1936
 HMS Franklin, built by Ailsa Shipbuilding Company, Troon, sold for scrapping 1956
 HMS Gleaner, built by William Gray & Company, Hartlepool, sold for scrapping 1950
 HMS Gossamer, built by William Hamilton and Company, bombed and sunk in Kola Inlet on 24 June 1942
 HMS Hazard, built by William Gray, sold for scrapping 1949
 HMS Hebe, built by HM Dockyard, Devonport, mined and sunk off Bari, 22 November 1943
 HMS Jason, built by Ailsa, sold out of service 1946, sold for scrapping 1950
 HMS Leda, built by HM Dockyard Devonport, torpedoed and sunk by U-435 in Greenland Sea on 20 September 1942
 HMS Seagull, built by HM Dockyard Devonport, sold for scrapping 1956
 HMS Sharpshooter, built by HM Dockyard Devonport, renamed Shackleton 1953 and converted to survey vessel, sold for scrapping 1965.
Ordered 1937
 HMS Bramble, built by HM Dockyard Devonport, sunk by gunfire from German warships in Barents Sea, 31 December 1942
 HMS Britomart, built by HM Dockyard Devonport, sunk in error by RAF aircraft off Cap d'Antifer, 27 August 1944
 HMS Scott, built by Caledon Shipbuilding & Engineering Company, Dundee, sold for scrapping 1965
 HMS Speedy, built by William Hamilton and Company, sold out of service 1946, sold for scrapping 1957
 HMS Sphinx, built by William Hamilton and Company, bombed by German aircraft off Kinnaird Head on 3 February 1940, later sank under tow and wreck washed ashore off Lybster, salvaged and scrapped 1950

References 

 British and Empire Warships of the Second World War, H. T. Lenton, Greenhill Books, 
 Warships of World War II, by H. T. Lenton & J. J. Colledge, Ian Allan Ltd,

External links 

 Halcyon class website
 HMS Bramble "BBC People's War"
 HMS Hussar "BBC People's War"

 
Mine warfare vessel classes
Ship classes of the Royal Navy